Labicymbium montanum is a species of sheet weaver found in Venezuela. It was described by Millidge in 1991.

References

Linyphiidae
Endemic fauna of Venezuela
Spiders of South America
Spiders described in 1991